Robert Coleman may refer to:

Robert Colman or Coleman (died 1428), English medieval Franciscan friar and university chancellor
Robert Coleman (geologist), American geologist
Robert Coleman (industrialist) (1748–1825), American industrialist
Robert Coleman (sailor) (1883–1960), British Olympic sailor
Bob Coleman (1890–1959), U.S. baseball player
Bobby Coleman (born 1997), American actor
Robert F. Coleman (1954–2014), U.C. Berkeley mathematician and MacArthur Fellow
Robert Coleman-Senghor (1940–2011), Sonoma State University professor and mayor of Cotati, California
Robert S. Coleman, American chemist
Robert Habersham Coleman (1856–1930), American iron processing and railroad industrialist
Robert L. Coleman (?–1924), American financier assassinated in Albania
Robert M. Coleman (Texan politician) (1799–1837), American/Texan politician and soldier
Robert M. Coleman (American football) (1878–1941), American college football player, coach, and physician
Robert Coleman (American actor) in The Radio Reader
Rob Coleman (born 1964), Canadian special effects artist